is the second solo single by Tomomi Itano (a Japanese idol, a member of AKB48). It was released in Japan on July 13, 2011, on the label You, Be Cool! (a subsidiary of King Records).

The physical CD single reached first place in the Japanese Oricon weekly singles chart. According to Oricon, it was the 59th most selling CD single of the whole year 2011 in Japan.

Background 
The single was released in four versions: Type A, Type B, Type C, and a theater edition.

Track listing

Type A

Type B

Type C

Theater Edition

Charts

Year-end charts

References

External links 
 Type A at Sony Music

2011 singles
Songs with lyrics by Yasushi Akimoto
Tomomi Itano songs
King Records (Japan) singles
2011 songs
Oricon Weekly number-one singles
Billboard Japan Hot 100 number-one singles